Dobrodeyevka is a rural locality (a selo) in Zlynkovsky District, Bryansk Oblast, Russia. The population was 451 as of 2010. There are 7 streets.

Geography 
Dobrodeyevka is located 11 km northwest of Zlynka (the district's administrative centre) by road. Vyshkov is the nearest rural locality.

References 

Rural localities in Zlynkovsky District